A Night for Baku is the 14th album by Djam Karet.

Track listing
 "Dream Portal" – 5:27
 "Hungry Ghost" – 9:17
 "Chimera Moon" – 7:08
 "Heads on Ni-Oh" – 8:03
 "Scary Circus" – 3:41
 "Falafel King" – 3:23
 "Sexy Beast" – 4:25
 "Ukab Maerd" – 7:56
 "The Red Thread" – 10:31

Credits
 Gayle Ellett – Electric Guitar, Ebow & Slide Guitar, Organ, Analog synth & Digital Synths, 8 String Lute, Theremin, Field Recordings & Effects
 Mike Henderson – Electric Guitars, Ebow, Synths, Field Recordings & Effects
 Aaron Kenyon – Bass (Tracks 2, 4-7 & 9)
 Chuck Oken, Jr. – drums, percussion, Analog & Digital Synths, Sounds & Sequencing
 Henry J. Osborne – Bass (Tracks 1, 3, 5, & 8)

Additional musicians
Steve Roach – Ending Guitar Atmospheres (Track 8)

External links
 A page on the band's official site

2003 albums
Djam Karet albums
Post-rock albums by American artists
Cuneiform Records albums